Crocodylus Park is a zoo situated in Knuckey Lagoon, Northern Territory, Australia. It specialises in the conservation of saltwater and freshwater crocodiles and features a comprehensive crocodile museum. The park also has big cats, monkeys, birds, turtles and snakes.

Crocodilians

American alligator
Freshwater crocodile
New Guinea crocodile
Philippine crocodile
Saltwater crocodile

Other animal species

African lion (white-coated)
Agile wallaby
Asian water buffalo
Australian jabiru
Banteng
Black-handed spider monkey
Black-headed python
Blood python
Blue peafowl
Boa constrictor
Brown capuchin
Burmese python
Bush stone-curlew
Common marmoset
Corn snake
Cotton-top tamarin
Dingo
Double-wattled cassowary
Elongated tortoise
Emu
Green anaconda
Green iguana
Hamadryas baboon
Indian star tortoise
Leopard tortoise
Magpie goose
Major Mitchell's cockatoo
Malayan box turtle
Maned wolf
Meerkat
Ostrich
Red kangaroo
Reticulated python
Rhinoceros iguana
Serval
Timor pony

References

External links

1994 establishments in Australia
Zoos established in 1994
Zoos in the Northern Territory
Tourist attractions in Darwin, Northern Territory